The 2015–16 Australian Baseball League season was the sixth Australian Baseball League (ABL) season, held from 23 October 2015 to 6 February 2016.

Teams

Regular season

Standings

Statistical leaders

Postseason

Bracket

Preliminary Final Series

Game 1

Game 2
The second game of the series was scheduled to be played on 30 January, but was postponed due to wet weather. It was rescheduled to be the first game of a doubleheader the following day.

Game 3

Composite Line Score
2016 ABL Preliminary Final Series (2–1): Adelaide Bite over Canberra Cavalry

Championship Series

Game 1

Game 2

Composite Line Score
2016 ABL Championship Series (2–0): Brisbane Bandits over Adelaide Bite

References

External links 
The Australian Baseball League – Official ABL Website
Official Baseball Australia Website

 
Australian Baseball League seasons
Australian Baseball League
Australian Baseball League